The Palestinian Civil Police Force (al-Shurtah al-Madaniyah al-Filistiniyah) is the Civil Police organization tasked with traditional law enforcement duties in the autonomous territory governed by the Palestinian National Authority. The Civil Police is a part of the Palestinian Security Services.

History

The Civil Police was formally established with the May 1994 signing of the Gaza–Jericho Agreement, a chapter in the Oslo Accords process, under the umbrella of the General Security Service. Founded with over 10,000 officers, it was the largest substituent of the Palestinian National Security Forces. The agreement called for the civil police maintaining public order from 25 stations throughout the Palestinian-administered parts of the Gaza Strip and the West Bank.

Long-time Police head Ghazi al-Jabali was criticised for corruption and curbing press and civil rights freedoms. In 2004 he was kidnapped by the Jenin Martyrs Brigades, part of the Popular Resistance Committees, and only released after Palestinian President Yasser Arafat agreed to fire him. Al-Jabali was replaced with Arafat's cousin, Musa Arafat, a move which did little to restore public confidence in Police.

According to the International Crisis Group, Palestinian police and security forces succeeded in effectively "preventing, prosecuting and reducing crime" in the late 1990s. 

During the course of the Second Intifada and its armed conflict, Palestinian police were unable to patrol armed or in uniform, lest they be engaged by Israeli security forces as combatants. As the armed conflict petered out after three years, Palestinian police forces returned to regular operations in 2003-2004.

Development
In order to aid the Palestinian government in "establishing sustainable and effective civil policing arrangements", the European Union Co-ordinating Office for Palestinian Police Support, EUPOLCOPPS, was established beginning 2006.

The Palestinian Civil Police development includes creation of a Jericho Police Training School, and strengthening of investigative sectors like Crime Investigation Department, Anti-Narcotics General Administration, and Investigation Section.

The EUCOPPS mission has facilitated the training of Civil Police personnel as well as the donation of equipment including vehicles from European donor-states.

A Palestinian Local Aid Coordination Secretariat strategic report on the Civil Police lists among the force's strengths its leadership's youth and academic credentials, high loyalty and commitment to regulations and motivation, while weaknesses included poorly or undefined legal frameworks and logistical shortages, especially communications equipment and transportation.

Since 2007, the Palestinian Civil Police and the Israel Police have increased cooperation as confidence-building measures and a part of Palestinian institution-building. Since their jurisdictions are intertwined, cooperative tactics include having Israel police issue traffic citations to Palestinian drivers and repatriating the proceeds to the Palestinian Civil Police.

Ranks

See also
United States security assistance to the Palestinian Authority
Common Security and Defence Policy
European Union Police Mission for the Palestinian Territories

References

External links 

 

Law enforcement in the State of Palestine
Palestinian Security Services
1994 establishments in the Palestinian territories
Emergency services in the State of Palestine
National police forces